Gazella praegaudryi was a prehistoric, little known gazelle species that lived in Africa. It was small, and lived during the Pleistocene. It had little compressed horn cores and no forward turning metaconid of its P4. Fossils have been excavated from formations such as at Fort Ternan, Lothagam, and Namulungle.

References 

Prehistoric bovids
Pleistocene mammals of Africa
praegaudryi